Sohran-e Sofla (also Romanized as Sohrān-e Soflá; also known as Pā’īn Sahrān, Pa’īn Sahrūn, Pā’īn Sohrūn, Sohrān, Sohrān-e Pā’īn, Sohrūn-e Pā’īn (Persian: سهرون پايين), and Sohrūn) is a village in Nakhlestan Rural District, in the Central District of Kahnuj County, Kerman Province, Iran. At the 2006 census, its population was 180, in 39 families.

References 

Populated places in Kahnuj County